Saint-Valérien may refer to:

Saint-Valérien, Vendée, a commune in the French region of Pays-de-la-Loire
Saint-Valérien, Yonne, a commune in the French region of Bourgogne
Saint-Valérien, Quebec, a parish municipality in the province of Québec
Saint-Valérien-de-Milton, Quebec, a municipality in the province of Québec